Alfred Benjamin Sparks (7 January 1903 – 10 April 1954) was an Australian rules footballer who played for the Collingwood Football Club in the Victorian Football League (VFL).

Family
The son of George Metcalfe Sparks (1870-1947), and Mary May Sparks (1975-1949), née Impey, Alfred Benjamin Sparks  known as "Tom" or "Tommy" to his family  was born at Avoca, Victoria on 7 January 1903.

He married Eliza Clare Grimster (1901-1972) in 1940.

Football
Recruited from Avoca, he played in three consecutive First XVIII games with Collingwood in 1926.

Death
He died at his residence in Prahran, Victoria on 10 April 1954.

Notes

References

External links 
 		
 
 Alf Sparks's profile at Collingwood Forever

1903 births
1954 deaths
Australian rules footballers from Victoria (Australia)
Collingwood Football Club players